Loïc Duvart Nestor (born 20 May 1989) is a Guadeloupean professional footballer who plays as a centre-back for Grenoble Foot 38.

Club career
Born in Haguenau, France, Nestor joined the youth team of Le Havre in 2004, and turned professional in 2007, making his Ligue 2 debut on 6 November 2007 against CS Sedan.

International career
Nestor made one appearance for the France under-21 team in 2008.

Career statistics
Scores and results list Guadeloupe's goal tally first.

Honours
Le Havre
 Ligue 2: 2008

References

External links

1989 births
Living people
Association football defenders
Guadeloupean footballers
Guadeloupe international footballers
French footballers
France under-21 international footballers
French people of Guadeloupean descent
Le Havre AC players
LB Châteauroux players
Valenciennes FC players
Grenoble Foot 38 players
Ligue 1 players
Ligue 2 players
Championnat National 2 players
Championnat National 3 players
People from Haguenau
Footballers from Alsace
Sportspeople from Bas-Rhin